Eugene "Gus" Newport was the mayor of Berkeley, California, from 1979 to 1986. More recently he worked to help the Gulfport, Mississippi, community rebuild in the wake of damage from Hurricane Katrina. He was the second African American mayor of Berkeley.

Mayoralty
Newport was elected mayor in 1979 with the backing of Berkeley Citizens Action, a coalition of progressives, radicals and reformers. The BCA ran on a campaign of economic reform, inspired by a 1976 document, "The Cities’ Wealth: Programs for Community Economic Control in Berkeley, California." He held the mayoralty from 1979 to 1986.

Political views
Newport endorsed U.S. Senator Bernie Sanders' campaigns for the Democratic presidential nomination in 2016 and 2020.

See also
List of Democratic Socialists of America who have held office in the United States

Notes

Living people
Mayors of Berkeley, California
Democratic Socialists of America politicians from California
Year of birth missing (living people)
African-American mayors in California
21st-century African-American people